A  bronze statue of Kevin White by Pablo Eduardo is installed in Boston's Faneuil Hall, in the U.S. state of Massachusetts. The sculpture was installed in 2006.

References

External links

 Mayor Kevin White – Boston, MA

Bronze sculptures in Massachusetts
Monuments and memorials in Boston
Government Center, Boston
Outdoor sculptures in Boston
Sculptures of men in Massachusetts
Statues in Boston
2006 establishments in Massachusetts
2006 sculptures